SM U-31 was one of the 329 submarines serving in the Imperial German Navy in World War I.
U-31 was engaged in the naval warfare and took part in the First Battle of the Atlantic.

U-31 sailed from Wilhelmshaven on 13 January 1915 but disappeared shortly thereafter. It was assumed, correctly, she had struck a mine, and sunk with all hands somewhere in the North Sea.

Design
German Type U 31 submarines were double-hulled ocean-going submarines similar to Type 23 and Type 27 subs in dimensions and differed only slightly in propulsion and speed. They were considered very good high seas boats with average manoeuvrability and good surface steering.

The U-boat was armed with four  torpedo tubes, two fitted in the bow and two in the stern, and carried 6 torpedoes. The boat's complement was 4 officers and 31 enlisted.

Wreck discovery
However, the wreck was not formally identified until 9 September 2015 when the Dutch Lamlash wreck-diving team discovered the hull number engraved on a salvaged item of navigation equipment.

Summary
2012: Wreck found during  sonar survey by  Fugro for Offshore Windfarm Project by Scottish Power Renewables

2013 and 2014: Wreck surveyed by RNLNavy with divers and sonar in the course of the search for the wreck of HNLMS O13, lost on patrol in June 1940 in the North Sea. This wreck could be classified as a World War I SM U-31 series U-boat

2015: Wreck positively identified by Dutch divers from mv Lamlash - Haarlem as the SM U-31 (Hull number found on a “Fahrt Tabelle” (Manoeuvring Settings Table)).

References

Notes

Citations

Bibliography

External links

World War I submarines of Germany
1914 ships
Ships built in Kiel
U-boats commissioned in 1914
Maritime incidents in 1915
U-boats sunk in 1915
U-boats sunk by mines
World War I shipwrecks in the North Sea
German Type U 31 submarines
Ships lost with all hands